Frank Hughes (born October 1, 1949) is a Canadian former professional ice hockey winger who played 392 games in the World Hockey Association and five games in the National Hockey League between 1971 and 1978. He was a member of the Houston Aeros, California Golden Seals, and Phoenix Roadrunners.

Career statistics

Regular season and playoffs

External links
 

1949 births
Living people
California Golden Seals players
Canadian expatriate ice hockey players in the United States
Canadian ice hockey right wingers
Edmonton Oil Kings (WCHL) players
Houston Aeros (WHA) players
Ice hockey people from British Columbia
People from Fernie, British Columbia
Phoenix Roadrunners (WHA) players
Phoenix Roadrunners (WHL) players
Toronto Maple Leafs draft picks
Tucson Rustlers players
Western International Hockey League players